HMS Leopard was a 50-gun fourth rate ship of the line of the Royal Navy, built according to the 1733 proposals of the 1719 Establishment at Blackwall Yard, and launched on 30 October 1741.

Leopard was broken up in 1761.

Notes

References

Lavery, Brian (2003) The Ship of the Line - Volume 1: The development of the battlefleet 1650-1850. Conway Maritime Press. .

Ships of the line of the Royal Navy
1741 ships
Ships built by the Blackwall Yard